Prairiland Independent School District is a public school district based in the community of Pattonville, Texas (USA).

The district is located in eastern Lamar County and extends into a small portion of western Red River County.

In addition to Pattonville, Prairiland ISD also serves the towns of Blossom and Deport as well as the community of Cunningham.  A very small portion of Paris is in the district.

In 2009, the school district was rated "recognized" by the Texas Education Agency.

District Administration
Jeff Ballard- Superintendent

Schools
Prairiland High School (Pattonville) (Grades 9-12; Principal - Jason Hostetler )
 Prairiland Junior High     (Pattonville) (Grades 6-8;  Principal - Leslie Watson)
 Blossom Elementary         (Blossom)     (Grades PK-5; Principal - Brad Bassano)
 Deport Elementary          (Deport)      (Grades PK-5; Principal - Lanny Mathews)

Achievements
Prairiland ISD has made great strides in incorporating technology into its classrooms.  The district was featured in the December 2006 issue of THE Journal (a publication dedicated to technology issues in schools)  and its long-range plan has the district converting to a completely wireless network, among other options .
Prairiland ISD has been very active in the Texas Rural Education Association (an association of rural school districts in Texas), as two of its superintendents have served as President of TREA (Dr. L. C. Stout as its first president as well as James Morton who retired in November 2009.) .  Of the 11 presidents (past and present) of TREA, Prairiland ISD is the only district to furnish more than one.
Prairiland ISD recently completed renovation of its football stadium, featuring an astroturf playing surface .  Although astroturf fields at the high school level are not uncommon in Texas, where high school football is extremely popular, such a field is unusual for a school the size of Prairiland (which is classified by UIL as AA, the second smallest classification).  In addition, the school gymnasium features an overhead scoreboard, an uncommon feature at high school level facilities and very rare at a small school like Prairiland .
Prairiland Junior High was recognized by the Texas Business and Education Coalition on its 2007 Honor Roll of outstanding schools, the second consecutive year a Prairiland ISD school was so honored (Deport Elementary made the 2006 TBEC Honor Roll).  The feat was even more amazing in that the Junior High was only in its third year of existence (previously, grades 6-8 were housed at the Blossom and Deport campuses) .

References

External links
Prairiland ISD

School districts in Lamar County, Texas
School districts in Red River County, Texas